Martin Hromec (born 9 January 1976) is a Slovak professional tennis player. He has competed in the Davis Cup several times and men's doubles tournaments particularly in the mid to late 1990s. In the 1998 Davis Cup he played with Ján Krošlák.

References

External links
 
 

Slovak male tennis players
1976 births
Living people
Place of birth missing (living people)
20th-century Slovak people